La Guerche-sur-l'Aubois is a commune in the Cher department in the Centre-Val de Loire region of France.

Geography

Population

Sights
 Vestiges of Gallo-Roman occupation.
 Two watermills, at Faguin and l'Oie.
 The church of St. Etienne, dating from the twelfth century.
 An old ironworks.
 The fifteenth-century manorhouse at Chezelles.

See also
Communes of the Cher department

References

External links

 Official commune website 
 La Guerche on the ‘Stations vertes’ website 

Communes of Cher (department)
Nivernais
La Guerche-sur-l'Aubois